The Other Side is a 2015 French-Italian documentary film directed by Roberto Minervini. It was screened in the Un Certain Regard section at the 2015 Cannes Film Festival.

Premise
Roberto Minervini goes to Louisiana, where he documents drug addicts and anti-government militias.

Reception
On review aggregator website Rotten Tomatoes, the film holds an approval rating of 82% based on 22 reviews, and an average rating of 7.5/10. On Metacritic, the film has a weighted average score of 65 out of 100, based on 10 critics, indicating "generally favorable reviews".

Peter Debruge of Variety called it "a soul-draining, feature-length look at the bastard stepchildren of the American Dream".  Jordan Mintzer  of The Hollywood Reporter called it "a poetic but hermetic journey into a debauched and dangerous Deep South".

References

External links
 

2015 films
2015 documentary films
French documentary films
Italian documentary films
Documentary films about the United States
Films shot in Louisiana
2010s English-language films
2010s Italian films
2010s French films